Amarginops platus is a species of claroteid catfish endemic to the Democratic Republic of the Congo where it is only found around Kisangani.  It lives in river rapids and grows to a length of 17.0 cm (6.7 inches) SL.

References
 

Claroteidae
Fish described in 1917
Freshwater fish of Africa
Endemic fauna of the Democratic Republic of the Congo
Taxa named by John Treadwell Nichols
Taxa named by Ludlow Griscom